A utility vault is an underground room providing access to subterranean public utility equipment, such as valves for water or natural gas pipes, or switchgear for electrical or telecommunications equipment. A vault is often accessible directly from a street, sidewalk or other outdoor space, thereby distinct from a basement of a building.

Utility vaults are commonly constructed out of reinforced concrete boxes, poured concrete or brick. Small ones are usually entered through a manhole or grate on the topside and closed up by a manhole cover. Such vaults are considered confined spaces and can be hazardous to enter. Large utility vaults are similar to mechanical or electrical rooms in design and content.

See also
Dartford Cable Tunnel
Telecommunications pedestal
Utility cut
Utility tunnel

References

External links
Underground Utility Vaults - National Precast Concrete Association

Building engineering
Rooms
Subterranea (geography)